Tommy Flanagan Plays the Music of Harold Arlen is an album by jazz pianist Tommy Flanagan, with bassist George Mraz and drummer Connie Kay.

Recording and music
The album was recorded on September 30 and October 2, 1978, at SNS Productions, New York City. It was produced by Helen Merrill, who also sang on "Last Night When We Were Young". The compositions are by Harold Arlen and co-writers.

Releases 
The album was originally released in Japan by Trio Records. It was subsequently released on CD in Japan by DIW and on LP in the United States by Inner City Records.

Track listing 
"Between the Devil and the Deep Blue Sea" (Harold Arlen, Ted Koehler) – 5:45
"Over the Rainbow" (Arlen, E. Y. Harburg) – 4:20  
"A Sleepin' Bee" (Arlen, Truman Capote) – 6:04  
"Ill Wind" (Arlen, Koehler) – 6:35  
"Out of This World" (Arlen, Johnny Mercer) – 6:30  
"One for My Baby" (Harold Arlen, Mercer) – 3:12  
"Get Happy" (Arlen, Koehler) – 5:11  
"My Shining Hour" (Arlen, Mercer) – 5:15  
"Last Night When We Were Young" (Arlen, Harburg) – 5:59

Personnel 
 Tommy Flanagan – piano
 George Mraz – bass
 Connie Kay – drums
 Helen Merrill – vocals (track 9)

References 

1979 albums
Tommy Flanagan albums
DIW Records albums
Inner City Records albums